The Palladium was a cinema in the Swedish capital Stockholm that operated between 1918 and 1987. It was the largest cinema in Sweden when it opened with more than 1,200 seats. A number of premieres of Svensk Filmindustri releases took place there as well as foreign imports. The site is now the Casino Cosmopol.

References

Bibliography
 Mette Hjort & Ursula Lindqvist. A Companion to Nordic Cinema. John Wiley & Sons, 2016.

Cinemas in Sweden
Former cinemas
Entertainment venues in Sweden